{{Infobox comics story arc
 
|title = Annihilation: Conquest
|image          = Conquest-6---Cover.jpg
|caption        = Cover art for Annihilation: Conquest #6Art by Aleksi Briclot
|publisher      = Marvel Comics
|startmo        = August
|startyr        = 2007
|endmo          = June
|endyr          = 2008
|multigenre     = y
|SciFi          = first
|Superhero      = y
|Crossover      = y
|titles         = 
|main_char_team = Guardians of the GalaxyAdam WarlockSuper-SkrullCaptain UniverseMantisHigh EvolutionaryRonanBlaastarPhalanxUltron
|writers        = 
|artists        = 
|pencillers     = 
|inkers         = 
|letterers      = 
|editors        = 
|colorists      = 
|TPB            = Volume One
|ISBN           = 0-7851-2782-8
|TPB1           = Volume Two
|ISBN1          = 0-7851-2716-X
|cat            = Marvel Comics
|sortkey        = Annihilation: Conquest
|self-titled    = y
}}Annihilation: Conquest is a 2007–08 Marvel Comics crossover storyline and the sequel to 2006's "Annihilation". The series again focuses on Marvel's cosmic heroes defending the universe against the Phalanx, now led by Ultron. Nova returns once more in a title role, along with Quasar, Star-Lord, and a new character called Wraith.

Other characters featured were Ronan the Accuser, Moondragon, Super-Skrull, Gamora, Mantis and Rocket Raccoon. The series also saw the return of Adam Warlock to the Marvel Universe.

Publication history
The format mirrored that of its predecessor with one minor difference; instead of four four-issue mini-series preceding the six-issue main series, there were three. In place of the fourth, there were four issues of the ongoing series Nova.

Dan Abnett and Andy Lanning were given the task of overseeing the story; "We were approached by Andy Schmidt, who edited the first "Annihilation" storyline, and asked to pilot the next event, which Bill Rosemann is editing." They ended up writing the Prologue, the Nova series crossover and the main Annihilation: Conquest limited series.

The remaining mini-series by Christos Gage were focused on Quasar, Star-Lord by Keith Giffen and Wraith, by Javier Grillo-Marxuach.

Summary

The Prologue reveals that the Phalanx are the primary enemy after they use their technology as well as the devastation of the wake of the Annihilation Wave to take control of the Kree army.

The techno-organic Phalanx invaded the Kree Empire, using the Space Knights as pawns unwittingly brought to the Kree homeworld of Hala by the former Star-Lord, Peter Quill. Assimilating the majority of the population and encasing the Kree galaxy in a force field, the Phalanx conquered the Kree in a matter of weeks.

Soon afterward, a new warrior by the name of Wraith is captured by the Phalanx. Wraith is capable of easily defeating the Phalanx warriors by inflicting them with fear. Wraith expresses that he has no interest in fighting the Phalanx, but they proceed to attack him anyway. After being defeated, the Phalanx then dispatch Ronan the Accuser, who has been converted to their cause, to torture Wraith.  Wraith manages to escape along with the Super-Skrull, and is guided by the spirit of his deceased father to find the man who murdered his family.

Under interrogation by Ronan, Wraith reveals his origin: the son of an exiled Kree scientist. As a young boy, Wraith was kidnapped by the extra-dimensional Nameless Ones after his parents were murdered and bonded with the soul-stealing, strength-enhancing symbiotic Exolon. Wraith eventually murders his captors and returns to Kree space seeking his family's killer.

Elsewhere, Nova has heard of the disturbance in Kree space. He comes to investigate only to discover that he is trapped within Kree space. As he attempts to leave, he is badly wounded, and the power within him is transferred to a new warrior. As he revives, he is visited by Gamora, who has also been infected with the Phalanx virus. She quickly converts Nova as well, leading to a battle between Richard Rider and the new Nova, during which Gamora apparently kills the new Nova.

With the help of the Worldmind, Nova breaks free of the Phalanx's control, throwing off his Select programming, though the virus that has caused it remains in his system. Fleeing from his captors, Nova collapses a dwarf star to slingshot him out of the Phalanx field around Kree space and into uncharted territory. Unbeknownst to Nova, he has been followed by Gamora and Drax, both still Phalanx Selects.

At the onset of the Phalanx invasion, Peter Quill is at ground zero. He manages to find cover and make it to a Kree prison in which he meets several warriors to team with including, Mantis and Captain Universe. He resumes his former persona, Star-Lord, and takes off to fight against the Phalanx. The group quickly loses two of their warriors in battle.

After discovering that the Phalanx plan to infect the Kree with an airborne techno-virus, Star-Lord and friends—including Groot, who survived an earlier skirmish only to return as a sprig—find themselves on the run. The Phalanx capture all but Mantis, who slips away, and Captain Universe, who had planned to sacrifice himself to save the others but turns out to be their last hope.

Meanwhile, Quasar (Phyla-Vell) has been on the outskirts of Kree-Space, aiding those still suffering from the devastation of the Annihilation Wave when she learns of the Phalanx invasion. Accompanied by Moondragon, she follows the commands of a mysterious voice which instructs her to find the "savior" of the Kree empire. During her quest, she battles the Super Adaptoid, learns how to control her new quantum bands, and discovers more about Moondragon's history before watching her transform into an actual Dragon of the Moon.

Quasar and the newly transformed Moondragon track the savior to the remote planet Morag IV, but are ambushed by the Super-Adaptoid. The heroes recover thanks to the locals, but discover the Adaptoid has already reached the savior and is attempting to assimilate them. After a brief fight, the Adaptoid unleashes a destructive force on the nearby town, forcing Quasar to choose the innocents over the savior at the cost of exhausting her Quantum Bands.

Quasar finds herself, Moondragon, and the grateful natives of Morag IV in pitched battle against not only the Super-Adaptoid, but a host of Phalanx bent on assimilating the savior of the Kree—the enigmatic Adam Warlock.  Quasar and Moondragon ultimately defeat the Super-Adaptoid and, in the process, Quasar reabsorbs power into her quantum bands from the Super-Adaptoid that he had earlier absorbed. The mysterious voice guiding Quasar turns out to belong to the Kree Supreme Intelligence, who believed that Warlock would prove to be the Kree savior. Warlock was regenerating in a cocoon, but his regeneration was damaged by the Super-Adaptoid and the Phalanx. Moondragon and the Supreme Intelligence help Warlock re-emerge, but he is younger than expected (due to the prematurity of his re-emergence) and troubled, despite the mental work of Moondragon and the Supreme Intelligence to soothe him.

A Phalanx assimilated Xemnu, along with Shatterax and Korath, try to kill Moondragon, Quasar, and Adam. However, Adam Warlock whisks them away to where some miniature Kree are being held by the High Evolutionary. The Phalanx Technarchy's primary director is revealed to be Avengers villain Ultron. Ultron kills Korath and decides to involve himself in the battle personally.

Moondragon and Quasar seek to persuade the High Evolutionary to join them in their struggle against the Phalanx. Ultron finds them and apparently kills Moondragon. Ultron and Warlock prepare to battle. Blastaar, who was working against the Phalanx, appears to die.  Star-Lord appears to have the plans for the Phalanx Babel Spire and plans to infiltrate it.

Traveling with the High Evolutionary is Quasar and Moondragon. Adam stands against Ultron. The High Evolutionary is ultimately captured by the Phalanx, and is forced to transfer Ultron's essence into Adam's body or be destroyed. The High Evolutionary performs the transfer, seemingly betraying and killing Adam in the process. However, the Evolutionary makes a few cryptic remarks to Ultron's former body once the transfer is complete, suggesting that there are layers of complexity to the situation that the Evolutionary is keeping to himself. Ultron awakes in Adam's body, unaware of these remarks and pleased with the results. Controlling Adam's abilities better than Adam could, Ultron gathered the Phalanx to end the resistance against him in the form of Star-Lord and his team. Then, he plans on controlling an army of Adam Warlocks to conquer Earth.

During this time, Star-Lord is captured and tortured by Ultron. Bug, Rocket Raccoon and Mantis concoct a plan that involves Groot growing inside the Babel Tower and destroying it from the inside out. Mantis uses her telepathic powers to increase his growing abilities and to ignite the flammable chemicals in his body when the time is right. This would result in his death, but Groot approves since he would die a hero, befitting his status. Rocket Raccoon takes a cutting of Groot to regrow the royal tree. The plan goes well, as Star-Lord is rescued, but the team must jump off the spire to survive. Groot uses the last of his life energy to grow a protrusion to catch them as they fall.

Mantis explains the loss of Groot and that Star-Lord would not have gone along with the plan if he knew three of his teammates would die. Star-Lord does not understand how three would die as only Gabe/Captain Universe and Groot have died (he doesn't count Deathcry as a member of the team). Mantis says she saw Ultron appearing and killing her at that moment. In Adam Warlock's body, Ultron does appear and cripples her with a blow to the head.

Outside the energy shield, a gathering of ships from the Badoon, Rigellians, Galadorian Spaceknights, Spartoi and remaining Kree constantly batter the shield with all their weaponry, failing to get through. Suddenly, Nova appears with Drax and Gamora (both free of the Phalanx) along with two members of the Technarchy, one being Warlock. The Technarchy begot the Phalanx and have come to set things right. They penetrate the shield and engage Ultron. Ultron easily outmaneuvers Nova but cannot defeat Warlock and the Technarchy. Warlock then infects Ultron with a slow-acting version of the Techno-Organic Virus, which causes Ultron to flee.

Ronan the Accuser leads 15,000 Kree Sentries to Hala to destroy all Phalanx and Phalanx-infected Kree on Hala. After seeing Nova, Phyla-Vell, Drax and Gamora standing up to the Phalanx, the fleet calls for the attack of Hala to be called off. Ronan refuses, and orders Praxagora to fire, but she refuses. Ultron has passed his essence into her and stuns Wraith so he can transfer his essence into the Sentries. As he is leaving Praxagora's body, he destabilizes her fusion core and kills her. This results in the ship carrying Ronan, Ra-venn and the Super-Skrull to be destroyed. Only Kl'rt's forcefields save them.
 
As he departs, the High Evolutionary reveals that Adam is still alive and will continue to lead the group. It turns out that he was stored in the gems on the Quantum Bands Phyla-Vell wore. She returns his soul to his body. Ultron takes control of the Kree altered Sentries and forms one giant Ultron form. Adam and Phyla-Vell stand against him, and Adam transfers all the souls of the Kree lost in the Conquest to the Quantum Bands, energizing them and reforging Phyla-Vell's sword. She dealt the death blow to Ultron, after Wraith had used his Exolons to trap Ultron in his current body so he can't leap to the next.

As Phyla-Vell mourned Moondragon's death, Adam came to her and expressed Star-Lord's plan to form a team to stand against galactic threats and prevent further catastrophes from happening.

Resistance

Sequels and spin-offs
The main characters in this story would go on to form the core of the new Guardians of the Galaxy, also written by Abnett/Lanning.

Collected editions

In other media
 The 2014 Guardians of the Galaxy film took some inspiration from this event, as well as the ongoing Guardians of the Galaxy'' series that spun out of it.

References

External links

 
 Annihilation Checklist at Marvel.com
 George, Richard (February 24, 2007). "NYCC 07: Halo Rocks the House of Ideas". IGN.  
 Richards, Dave (April 20, 2007). "War Coverage: Rosemann & Artists talk 'Annihilation Conquest' covers". Comic Book Resources.
Review of Volume 1, Comics Bulletin

Comics by Christos Gage
Comics set on fictional planets
2008 comics endings